Jeremy Welsh (born April 30, 1988) is a Canadian professional ice hockey centre currently playing under contract with UK Elite Ice Hockey League (EIHL) side Nottingham Panthers. Welsh was most recently with Cracovia of the Polska Hokej Liga (PHL) and has formerly played in the National Hockey League (NHL) with the Carolina Hurricanes, Vancouver Canucks and St. Louis Blues.

Playing career
Welsh signed a one-year entry level contract with the Hurricanes on April 5, 2012 and played in his first NHL game two days later against the Florida Panthers. Prior to the start of the 2013–14 season Welsh was traded, along with Zac Dalpe, to the Canucks in exchange for Kellan Tochkin and a fourth round selection in the 2014 NHL Draft.

Welsh scored his first NHL goal with the Canucks on November 22, 2013 against Sergei Bobrovsky of the Columbus Blue Jackets.

On July 21, 2014, Welsh signed a one-year, two-way deal as a free agent with the St. Louis Blues.

After two seasons within the Blues organization, Welsh left to sign his first contract abroad, agreeing to a one-year deal with new German DEL entrant, the Fischtown Pinguins on September 1, 2016. In his debut season in Germany in 2016–17, Welsh enjoyed a productive season in compiling 13 goals and 29 points in 36 games.

At the conclusion of his contract, Welsh opted to continue in the DEL, in agreeing to a one-year deal as a free agent with Düsseldorfer EG on May 17, 2017.

As a free agent to begin the 2018–19 season, Welsh agreed to a try-out contract with Czech outfit, HC Dynamo Pardubice of the Czech Extraliga on November 23, 2018. Welsh made 4 appearances for Pardubice, collecting 1 assist, before ending his trial with the club and returning to the DEL in securing a one-year deal for the remainder of the season with Grizzlys Wolfsburg on December 10, 2018. Welsh contributed to Wolfsburg offensively with 18 points in 26 games before leaving as a free agent at the conclusion of the season on March 8, 2019.

On May 5, 2019, Welsh opted to continue in the DEL, signing a one-year contract with his fourth top flight club, Krefeld Pinguine.

After spending the 2020–21 season in Poland with Cracovia, Welsh agreed to join UK EIHL side Nottingham Panthers for the 2021–22 season.

Career statistics

Awards and honors

References

External links
 

1988 births
Living people
Canadian ice hockey centres
Carolina Hurricanes players
Charlotte Checkers (2010–) players
Chicago Wolves players
HC Dynamo Pardubice players
Düsseldorfer EG players
Fischtown Pinguins players
Krefeld Pinguine players
MKS Cracovia (ice hockey) players
Nottingham Panthers players
St. Louis Blues players
Undrafted National Hockey League players
Union Dutchmen ice hockey players
Utica Comets players
Vancouver Canucks players
Grizzlys Wolfsburg players
AHCA Division I men's ice hockey All-Americans
Canadian expatriate ice hockey players in Germany
Canadian expatriate ice hockey players in the United States
Canadian expatriate ice hockey players in the Czech Republic
Canadian expatriate ice hockey players in Poland
Canadian expatriate ice hockey players in England
Ice hockey people from Ontario
People from Huron County, Ontario